Shadow of the Castles is a 1977 French drama film written and directed by Daniel Duval. It was entered into the 10th Moscow International Film Festival where it won the Silver Prize.

Cast
 Philippe Léotard as Luigi
 Albert Dray as Rico
 Zoé Chauveau as Fatoun
 Marcel Dalio as Père Renard (as Dalio)
 Stéphane Bouy as Le jeune avocat
 Yves Beneyton as Le chef motard
 Martine Ferrière as La mère supérieure
 Jean Puyberneau as L'avocat
 Louise Chevalier as La réligieuse
 Jean-François Chauvel as Le président du Tribunal
 Philippe Duval as Le père Capello
 Clara Boulet as Le mère Capello

References

External links
 

1977 films
1977 drama films
French drama films
1970s French-language films
Films produced by Michel Seydoux
1970s French films